Leonard Ross Fisher  (born 1942) is an Australian physicist, and visiting senior research fellow at the University of Bristol, UK. He is known for his research into everyday topics, such as the optimal way to dunk a biscuit, and the optimum use of cheese in a cheese sandwich.

Education 
Fisher received a BSc in chemistry and pure mathematics, and an MSc in radiation chemistry from the University of Sydney. He has a PhD in physics of surfaces from the University of New South Wales.

Career 
Fisher has been a visiting senior research fellow in the school of physics at the University of Bristol since 1992.

Research 
In 1998, Fisher published a study on the optimal way to dunk a biscuit. The study concluded that 10 times more flavour is released from a biscuit if it has first been dunked in a hot drink. This research was funded by McVities.

In 2000, Fisher studied the absorption of gravy by a roast dinner. He found that 700,000 litres of gravy is wasted every week in the UK when it is poured on food and not consumed. He also calculated a gravy absorption index, and published a set of rules to maximise the absorption of gravy by food. Following on from this work, in 2001, he researched the best bread to absorb gravy with, concluding that ciabatta soaks up the most.

In 2003, Fisher produced a report for the British Cheese Board, titled "Optimum Use of Cheese in a Cheese Sandwich". He found that the optimum thickness for the filling in a cheese sandwich is dependent on the type of cheese used, and that the sandwich should be made with a light spread of butter or margarine to enhance the flavour of the cheese. This research has drawn criticism for being 'frivolous'.

Publications 
 How to Dunk a Doughnut: The Science of Everyday Life (2002) 
 Weighing the Soul: The Evolution of Scientific Ideas (2004)
 Rock, Paper, Scissors: Game Theory in Everyday Life (2008)
 The Perfect Swarm: The Science of Complexity in Everyday Life (2009)
 Crashes, Crises and Calamities: How We Can Use Science to Read the Early-Warning Signs (2011)

Awards 
Fisher was presented with the Ig Nobel Prize for Physics, in 1999, for calculating the optimal way to dunk a biscuit.

In 2004, Fisher was named Science Writer of the Year by the American Institute of Physics for How to Dunk a Doughnut: The Science of Everyday Life.

In 2019, Fisher was awarded the Medal of the Order of Australia for his contribution to science.

References 

1942 births
Living people
Academics of the University of Bristol
Australian physicists
Recipients of the Medal of the Order of Australia
University of New South Wales alumni
University of Sydney alumni